Alon Cohen ((); born in Israel, 1962) is the co-founder of VocalTec Inc. (1989) and the co-inventor of the Audio Transceiver that enabled the creation of Voice Over Networks products and eventually the VoIP industry. Cohen holds four US patents on different communications technologies. He is currently Executive VP and CTO at Phone.com.

Early life 

Cohen received an MBA and a BSC.EE from Tel Aviv University, both magna cum laude. He served in the Israel Defense Forces as part of the telecommunications wing.

Career 

In 1989, Cohen and Lior Haramaty founded VocalTec Communications Inc. in Herzliya, Israel. The tech company is the pioneer of the VoIP industry. They released the first internet phone in February 1995. He is also the inventor of the Audio Transceiver (U.S. Patent 5,825,771) that enabled the creation of Voice Over Networks products and eventually the VoIP industry. Cohen holds five US patents on communications technologies. VocalTec is the first company to provide Internet voice technology worldwide, and in 1996 was one of the earliest Internet IPOs (NASDAQ: vocl).

After leaving VocalTec, Cohen founded and managed a series of business ventures, including BitWine and RemoteAbility. He currently serves as Executive Vice President and CTO at Phone.com.

Cohen is a frequent speaker at industry conferences, serves on technical advisory boards or as a mentor of a number of companies, and has also served as an expert witness in VoIP patent litigation trials.

Cohen has an active blog where he writes about technology and innovations.

Awards and honors 

Cohen received awards and accolades for his work including the “VoIP Visionary Award” (2005) from Jeff Pulver's Pulvermedia and the VoIP Hall of Fame Award by TMCNET in 2015. Cohen was also named, by “The Marker”, the leading Israeli business newspaper, as one of the “100 Most Influential Israelis” in Israel's High Technology history in September 2005.

Cohen represented the State of Israel in the United Nations negotiations of the ITU Study Group 16 for the development and ratification of global VoIP standards.

Cohen also holds five US patents on different communications technologies, and co-authored more as part of VocalTec.

Personal life 

Cohen resides in New Jersey with his wife and two sons.

References

External links
 
 Executive Team at Phone.com

Israeli Jews
1962 births
Living people
21st-century Israeli inventors